Akalgarh is a village in Tehsil Phagwara, Kapurthala district, in Punjab, India. The village is administrated by a Sarpanch, who is an elected representative.

Demography 
According to the report published by Census India in 2011, Akalgarh has 228 houses with the total population of 1,104 persons of which 561 are male and 543 females. Literacy rate of  Akalgarh is 80.39%, higher than the state average of 75.84%.  The population of children in the age group 0–6 years is 140 which is 12.68% of the total population.  Child sex ratio is approximately 892, higher than the state average of 846.

Population data

Transport 
Mandhali Railway Station, Phagwara Junction Railway Station are the very nearby railway stations to Akalgarh however, Jalandhar City Rail Way station is 25 km away from the village. The village is 120 km away from Sri Guru Ram Dass Jee International Airport in Amritsar and the another nearest airport is Sahnewal Airport in Ludhiana which is located 45 km away from the village.

References

External links
  Villages in Kapurthala
 Kapurthala Villages List

Villages in Kapurthala district